Dušan Pešić (born 26 April 1955) is a former Yugoslav and Serbian footballer who played as an attacking midfielder.

Club career
Pešić started out at his hometown club Napredak Kruševac, making his senior debut in 1973. He helped the side win promotion to the Yugoslav First League on two occasions (1976 and 1978). In 1980, Pešić was transferred to Hajduk Split. He was a member of the team that won the Yugoslav Cup in the 1983–84 season.

In 1984, Pešić moved abroad to Turkey and signed with Fenerbahçe. He spent four years at the club and won the national championship in his debut season. In 1988, Pešić switched to Sakaryaspor and stayed there for one year.

International career
Between 1980 and 1983, Pešić earned four caps for Yugoslavia at full level. He also represented his country at the 1980 Summer Olympics.

Career statistics

Honours
Napredak Kruševac
 Yugoslav Second League: 1975–76, 1977–78
Hajduk Split
 Yugoslav Cup: 1983–84
Fenerbahçe
 1.Lig: 1984–85
 Turkish Super Cup: 1985

References

External links
 
 
 
 

Association football midfielders
Expatriate footballers in Turkey
Fenerbahçe S.K. footballers
FK Napredak Kruševac players
Footballers at the 1980 Summer Olympics
HNK Hajduk Split players
Olympic footballers of Yugoslavia
Sakaryaspor footballers
Serbian footballers
Sportspeople from Kruševac
Süper Lig players
Yugoslav expatriate footballers
Yugoslav expatriate sportspeople in Turkey
Yugoslav First League players
Yugoslav footballers
Yugoslav Second League players
Yugoslavia international footballers
Yugoslavia under-21 international footballers
1955 births
Living people